Norman Steven Maciver (born September 1, 1964) is a Canadian professional ice hockey executive and former player. He is currently an associate general manager for the Chicago Blackhawks of the National Hockey League (NHL). As a player, he played defence for six teams in the NHL during a thirteen-year professional career.

Playing career

College hockey

University of Minnesota Duluth Bulldogs
Maciver was not drafted by an NHL franchise and instead took the university route in order to reach the NHL. The defenceman played four seasons with the University of Minnesota Duluth, where he was a two-time All American and a finalist for the Hobey Baker Award, awarded to the NCAA's top player, for the 1985–86 season. While playing at the University of Minnesota - Duluth, Maciver earned a communications degree and signed as a free agent with the NHL's New York Rangers upon graduation.

Professional hockey

New York Rangers (1986–1988)
Maciver signed as a free agent with the New York Rangers of the National Hockey League on September 8, 1986. Maciver began the 1986–87 with New York, as he made the club after a strong training camp and pre-season. On October 9, 1986, Maciver played in his first career NHL game, recording an assist on a powerplay goal scored by Lucien Deblois in a 5–3 loss to the New Jersey Devils. Maciver would play in four games with the Rangers during the season, earning an assist, as he spent a majority of the 1986–87 season with the Rangers American Hockey League affiliate, the New Haven Nighthawks. In 71 games with New Haven, Maciver scored six goals and 36 points. In seven post-season games with the Nighthawks, Maciver was held to no points.

Maciver split the 1987–88 season between New York and their International Hockey League affiliate, the Colorado Rangers. With Colorado during the 1987–88 season, Maciver scored six goals and 26 points in 27 games. Maciver was called up to New York in December, and in his first three games in the NHL, he earned three assists. On December 29, 1987, Maciver scored his first career NHL goal, scoring against Kelly Hrudey of the New York Islanders in a 3–3 tie. On February 7, 1988, Maciver scored his first career multi-point game in the NHL, as he had a goal and two assists in a 6–3 win over the Pittsburgh Penguins. Overall, in 37 games with New York, Maciver scored nine goals and 24 points.

Maciver began the 1988–89 in the NHL with the Rangers. On November 26, 1988, Maciver earned two assists in a 6–4 win over the New York Islanders. In 26 games with New York, Maciver scored no goals and had 10 assists.

On December 26, 1988, the Rangers traded Maciver, Brian Lawton, and Don Maloney to the Hartford Whalers for Carey Wilson and the Whalers fifth round draft pick in the 1990 NHL Entry Draft.

Hartford Whalers (1988–1989)
Following his trade from the New York Rangers, Maciver made his Hartford Whalers debut on December 26, 1988, as he had no points in a 4–3 loss to the Pittsburgh Penguins. In his next game with Hartford two nights later on December 28, Maciver scored his first goal with his new club, scoring against Mario Gosselin of the Quebec Nordiques, and added two assists for his second career three point NHL game, in a 4–4 tie against the Nordiques. In 37 games with the Whalers, Maciver scored one goal and 23 points, helping the club reach the post-season. On April 9, 1989, Maciver appeared in his first career playoff game, as he was held to no points in a 4–3 loss to the Montreal Canadiens.

Maciver began the 1989–90 with the Whalers American Hockey League affiliate, the Binghamton Whalers. In two games with Binghamton, Maciver had no points.

On October 10, 1989, Maciver was traded to the Edmonton Oilers for Jim Ennis.

Edmonton Oilers (1989–1992)
Maciver played the majority of the 1989–90 season with the Edmonton Oilers American Hockey League affiliate, the Cape Breton Oilers. In 68 games with Cape Breton, Maciver scored 13 goals and 50 points, as he was the highest scoring defenseman on the team. In six post-season games with Cape Breton, Maciver earned seven assists. Maciver appeared in one game with Edmonton during the 1989–90 season. He made his only NHL appearance on October 28, 1989, earning no points in a 6–3 win over the Quebec Nordiques.

Maciver began the 1990–91 season with Cape Breton. In 56 games in the AHL, Maciver scored 13 goals and 59 points before being recalled to Edmonton in February. On February 24, 1991, Maciver earned his first points with the Oilers, as he had two assists in a 6–3 win over the Quebec Nordiques. ON March 24, 1991, Maciver scored his first goal with Edmonton against Kelly Hrudey of the Los Angeles Kings in a 4–3 loss. In 21 games with Edmonton, Maciver scored two goals and seven points. On April 4, 1991, Maciver appeared in his first post-season game with the Oilers, as he had no points in a 3–1 win over the Calgary Flames. In the seventh game of the series against the Flames, Maciver earned an assist for his first career playoff point, as Edmonton defeated Calgary 5–4 to win the series. In 18 playoff games, Maciver earned four assists.

Maciver played the entire 1991–92 in the NHL. On February 2, 1992, Maciver tied his career high with points in a game, as he scored a goal and two assists, earning three points, in an 8–2 win over the Quebec Nordiques. Less than a month later, on March 1, 1992, Maciver repeated this feat, as he scored a goal and two assists in a 4–2 win over the Winnipeg Jets. In 57 games, Maciver scored six goals and 40 points, helping the club reach the post-season. On May 3, 1992, Maciver scored his first career NHL playoff goal, as he scored against Kirk McLean of the Vancouver Canucks in a 4–3 victory. In 13 playoff games, Maciver scored a goal and three points.

On October 4, 1992, Maciver was claimed by the Ottawa Senators off of waivers.

Ottawa Senators (1992–1995)
Maciver joined the newly formed expansion team, the Ottawa Senators, for the 1992–93 season. In his first game with the Senators on October 8, 1992, Maciver earned two assists, as the Senators defeated the Montreal Canadiens 5–3. Two nights later, in his second game with the club, Maciver had two more assists, in a 9–2 loss to the Quebec Nordiques. Maciver scored his first goal as a member of the Senators on October 20, 1992, scoring against Felix Potvin of the Toronto Maple Leafs in a 5–3 loss. On February 17, 1993, Maciver scored the first multi-goal game of his NHL career, as he scored twice against Ron Hextall of the Quebec Nordiques in a 6–4 loss. In 80 games with Ottawa, Maciver scored 17 goals and 63 points, setting career highs in goals and points, while leading the Senators in team scoring.

Maciver returned to the Senators for the 1993–94 season. In his first game of the season on October 6, 1993, Maciver scored a goal and two points in a 5–5 against the Quebec Nordiques. On November 3, 1993, Maciver set a new personal high for points in a game, as he scored a goal and three assists, earning four points, in a 7–5 over the Edmonton Oilers. Eight days later, on November 11, Maciver earned three assists in a 5–4 loss to the Florida Panthers. Injuries slowed Maciver down during the season, as he played in 53 games, scoring three goals and 23 points.

In 1994–95, Maciver began the season with the Senators. In 28 games with Ottawa, Maciver scored four goals and 11 points.

On April 7, 1995, the Senators traded Maciver and Troy Murray to the Pittsburgh Penguins for Martin Straka.

Pittsburgh Penguins (1995)
Maciver finished the 1994–95 season with the Pittsburgh Penguins. In his first game with the Penguins on April 8, 1995, Maciver had no points in a 2–1 loss to the Montreal Canadiens. In his next game with Pittsburgh on April 10, Maciver recorded his first points with the Penguins, two assists, in a 4–3 over his former club, the Ottawa Senators. In 13 games with Pittsburgh, Maciver earned nine assists. On May 6, 1995, Maciver played in his first post-season game with the Penguins, earning an assist in a 5–4 loss to the Washington Capitals. In game seven of the series against the Capitals, played on May 18, Maciver scored his first career playoff goal with the Penguins, scoring the game-winning goal against Jim Carey in a 3-0 Penguins victory, as Pittsburgh defeated the Capitals in seven games. In 12 post-season games, Maciver scored a goal and five points.

Maciver began the 1995–96 season with the Penguins. On November 4, 1995, Maciver had three assists in a 7–4 win over the Philadelphia Flyers. On November 21, 1995, Maciver scored his first regular season goal with the Penguins, as he scored against Mike Richter of the New York Rangers in a 9–4 loss. In 32 games with the Penguins, Maciver scored two goals and 23 points.

On December 28, 1995, Maciver was traded to the Winnipeg Jets for Neil Wilkinson.

Winnipeg Jets/Phoenix Coyotes (1995–1998)
Maciver finished the 1995–96 with the Winnipeg Jets. He played in his first game with the Jets on December 28, 1995, scoring an assist in a 4–3 loss to the Chicago Blackhawks. On January 5, 1996, Maciver scored his first goal as a member of the Jets, scoring against Darcy Wakaluk of the Dallas Stars in a 5–4 loss. In 37 games played with the Jets, Maciver scored five goals and 30 points, helping the club reach the post-season. On April 17, 1996, Maciver played in his first playoff game with Winnipeg, earning no points in a 4–1 loss to the Detroit Red Wings. On April 28, 1996, Maciver scored his first playoff goal with the Jets, scoring against Mike Vernon of the Red Wings in a 4–1 loss. The loss eliminated the Jets from the post-season, and Maciver scored the last goal in Winnipeg Jets history, as the club relocated to Phoenix, Arizona during the off-season.

Maciver moved with the franchise and was a member of the Phoenix Coyotes in the 1996–97 season. On October 5, 1996, Maciver appeared in the Coyotes first game, earning no points in a 1–0 loss to the Hartford Whalers. Two nights later, on October 7, Maciver scored his first goal with Phoenix, scoring against Bill Ranford of the Boston Bruins, in a 5–2 win. Maciver suffered through an injury plagued season, playing in only 32 games with Phoenix, scoring four goals and 13 points.

Maciver returned to the Coyotes for the 1997–98 season. Maciver scored a goal in the Coyotes season opener on October 1, 1997, as Phoenix defeated the Chicago Blackhawks 6–2. Injuries limited Maciver to 41 games during the regular season, as he scored two goals and eight points. On April 22, 1998, Maciver appeared in his first playoff game with Phoenix, as he had no points in a 6–3 loss to the Detroit Red Wings. Two nights later, Maciver earned his first playoff point with Phoenix, an assist, in a 7–4 victory over the Red Wings. In six post-season games, Maciver earned an assist.

Following the season, Maciver became a free agent.

Houston Aeros (1998–1999)
Maciver signed with the Houston Aeros of the International Hockey League for the 1998–99 season. In 49 games with the Aeros, Maciver scored six goals and 31 points, helping the team reach the post-season. Maciver played in 10 playoff games, earning five assists, as the Aeros won the Turner Cup.

Following the season, Maciver announced his retirement from hockey.

Post-playing career

Springfield Falcons (2000–2003)
Maciver joined the Springfield Falcons, the Phoenix Coyotes and New York Islanders American Hockey League affiliate, as an assistant coach for the 2000–01 season, working under head coach Marc Potvin. The Falcons struggled to a 29-37-8-6 record during the season, earning 72 points, and finishing in last place in the New England Division.

Maciver returned to the Falcons for the 2001–02, as the team was now the Coyotes and Tampa Bay Lightning affiliate. The Falcons improved to a 35-41-2-2 record, earning 74 points, however, the Falcons finished in last place in the North Division.

In 2002–03, the Falcons named Marty McSorley as head coach. Maciver remained with the club as an assistant coach. Springfield saw a slight improvement, as the club finished the season with a 34-38-7-1 record, earning 76 points, and reaching the Eastern Conference qualifier. In the qualifying series, Springfield upset the Hartford Wolf Pack, winning both games, to advance to the post-season. In the first round of the playoffs, the Falcons lost to the Hamilton Bulldogs three games to one.

Following the season, Maciver left the Falcons as he was promoted to the National Hockey League as an assistant coach with the Boston Bruins.

Boston Bruins (2003–2006)
Maciver joined the Boston Bruins in the 2003–04 as an assistant coach to head coach Mike Sullivan. The Bruins had a very successful season in 2003–04, as the club finished the regular season with a 41-19-15-7 record, earning 104 points, to finish in first place in the Northeast Division. In the post-season, the Bruins were upset by the Montreal Canadiens in the first round of the playoffs.

Maciver remained with the Bruins during the 2004–05 NHL lockout season.

When hockey resumed in 2005–06, Maciver returned to Boston as an assistant coach under Mike Sullivan. The Bruins struggled during the season, finishing a disappointing 29-37-16 record, earning 74 points, and failing the make the post-season. Following the season, Sullivan and his coaching staff were relieved of their duties.

Chicago Blackhawks (2006–present)
In 2006, Maciver was hired by the NHL's Chicago Blackhawks to serve as the club's director of player development, and was promoted to director of player personnel in 2011. After Marc Bergevin left the club to become the general manager of the Montreal Canadiens for the 2012–13 season, Maciver was promoted to assistant general manager. In July 2020, Maciver was demoted to vice president of player personnel and left the organization in January 2021 to become director of player personnel for the Seattle Kraken.

Maciver returned to the Blackhawks as an associate general manager on March 9, 2022. His return came five months after former Blackhawks GM Stan Bowman resigned and a week after the Blackhawks named Kyle Davidson as his successor.

Career statistics

Regular season and playoffs

International

Awards and honours

AHL First All-Star Team (1991) 
Eddie Shore Award (Outstanding Defenseman - AHL) (1991)

Transactions 
September 8, 1986 – Signed as a free agent by the New York Rangers.
December 26, 1988 – Traded to the Hartford Whalers by the New York Rangers with Brian Lawton and Don Maloney for Carey Wilson and the Hartford Whalers' 5th round choice (Lubos Rob) in 1990 NHL Entry Draft.
October 10, 1989 – Traded to the Edmonton Oilers by the Hartford Whalers for Jim Ennis.
October 4, 1992 – Claimed by the Ottawa Senators from the Edmonton Oilers in NHL Waiver Draft.
April 7, 1995 – Traded to the Pittsburgh Penguins by the Ottawa Senators with Troy Murray for Martin Straka.
December 28, 1995 – Traded to the Winnipeg Jets by the Pittsburgh Penguins for Neil Wilkinson.
July 1, 1996 – Transferred to the Phoenix Coyotes after the Winnipeg Jets franchise relocated.

References

External links
 

1964 births
Binghamton Whalers players
Boston Bruins coaches
Canadian ice hockey defencemen
Cape Breton Oilers players
Chicago Blackhawks executives
Colorado Rangers players
Edmonton Oilers players
Hartford Whalers players
Houston Aeros (1994–2013) players
Ice hockey people from Ontario
Living people
Minnesota Duluth Bulldogs men's ice hockey players
New Haven Nighthawks players
New York Rangers players
Ottawa Senators players
Phoenix Coyotes players
Pittsburgh Penguins players
Sportspeople from Thunder Bay
Stanley Cup champions
Undrafted National Hockey League players
Winnipeg Jets (1979–1996) players
Canadian ice hockey coaches
AHCA Division I men's ice hockey All-Americans